Lawrence Francis "Pat" Kramer, Jr. (born February 24, 1933) was the Mayor of Paterson, New Jersey from 1967 to 1972 and 1975 until 1982.

Kramer ran for Governor of New Jersey in the Republican primary in 1981. He came in second to future Governor Thomas Kean.

Biography
The fifth child and first son born to Lawrence and Ann Kramer, Kramer attended School No. 20, Central High School (now John F. Kennedy High School and Clemson University before earning a degree from Farleigh Dickinson University.

References

1933 births
Living people
John F. Kennedy High School (Paterson, New Jersey) alumni
New Jersey Republicans
Mayors of Paterson, New Jersey
Clemson University alumni
Fairleigh Dickinson University alumni